Sarabion, also written as Srabion or Sarabioun is a village belonging to the city of Jableh, located in the mountains of the Syrian coast, administratively affiliated to Al-Qutailibiyah circle and it is part the municipality of Dweir Baabda. The village is one of the oldest inhabited villages in the Syrian coast.

Geography
Neighboring villages include Hraisoun حريصون, Qurfays, and Dweir Baabda.

The area has a Mediterranean climate, with high humidity in summer and heavy rain in winter.

Demography
Important figures from the village include Sheikh Abdullah Al-Sarbouni.

Family names in the village include Ismael, Mohammad, Saleh, Ali, Skeif, Wannous, Masoud, Khalil, Abdulkarim, Darweesh, Mhanna, Safi, Aziz, Hashem, Asaad, Saada, Mahmoud, Eskandar, and others.

Neighborhoods 
Al Hara, Al Hara Al Fouqanyah, Al Hara Al Tehtanyah, Karm Elrejmeh, Al Rabaá, Haret Al Sheikh, AL Kzaiber, Harf Al Aswad, Naghbeen, Al Dawara. (Sarabion.com)

The village's residents work mainly in agriculture. The most important crops in the village are olives, tobacco and wheat. Most of the village's residents own real estate and agricultural lands in the neighboring villages (Harisoun, Muhurta, Ras al-Wata, Bashnana)

References 

Populated places in Jableh District